Deep in the Heart of Nowhere is the first solo studio album by Bob Geldof, the ex-Boomtown Rats lead singer. It was released in November 1986. The collection reached No. 79 for one week in the UK Albums Chart in December 1986.

The main single was "This Is the World Calling" with "Love Like a Rocket" also being released as a single. It was remastered and re-released in 2005 with his (at the time) three other solo albums as part of The Great Songs of Indifference: The Anthology 1986-2001 collection, and included four bonus tracks.

Track listing
All songs were written by Bob Geldof, except where noted.
 "This Is the World Calling" (Geldof, Raymond Doom) – 4:29
 "In the Pouring Rain" – 4:30
 "August Was a Heavy Month" – 5:07
 "Love Like a Rocket" (Geldof, Doom) – 5:23
 "I Cry Too" – 4:25
 "When I Was Young" – 5:51
 "This Heartless Heart" – 4:13
 "The Beat of the Night" – 5:33
 "Truly, True Blue" – 1:19
 "Pulled Apart by Horses" – 4:29
 "Words from Heaven" – 4:40
 "Good Boys in the Wrong" – 5:18
 "Night Turns to Day" – 4:53
 "Deep in the Heart of Nowhere" – 1:19
Great Songs of Indifference re-release
"Life Is the Hardest Thing" – 3:13
 "Friends for Life" – 5:29
 "August Was a Heavy Month" (Instrumental) – 4:01
 "Dig a Ditch" – 4:28

Personnel
 David A. Stewart - guitars, keyboards
 Eric Clapton - guitar on "Love Like a Rocket", "Beat of the Night" and "August Was a Heavy Month"
 Brian Setzer - guitar 
 Jamie West-Oram - guitar 
 Alison Moyet - vocals on "This Is the World Calling"
 Midge Ure
 Omar Hakim
 Suzie O'List
 Clem Burke
 Pat Seymour
 Maria McKee - vocals on "This Is the World Calling"
 Annie Lennox - vocals on "This Is the World Calling"
 Gill O'Donovan
 Mint Julep
 Jools Holland
 Sonny Southern
 Maria Albert
 Lianne Davis
 T. M. Stevens
 Bono
Technical
 The Brothers of Doom – producer on "This Is the World Calling" and "In the Pouring Rain"
 Jimmy Iovine – producer on "This Is the World Calling" and "In the Pouring Rain"
 Rupert Hine - producer on all tracks except "This Is the World Calling" and "In the Pouring Rain"
 Stephen W Tayler - recorder and mixer
 Andrew Scarth, Jon Bavin, Joe Chiccarelli - engineers
Brian Aris - cover photography

Singles
 "This Is the World Calling" / "Talk Me Up" (20 October 1986)
 "Love Like a Rocket" (Remix) / "Pulled Apart By Horses" (26 January 1987) (UK & European release)
 "Heartless Heart" / "Pulled Apart By Horses" (1987) (US release)
 "I Cry Too" / "Let's Go" (8 June 1987) (UK release)
 "In the Pouring Rain" / "Let's Go" (1987) (Non-UK European release)

References

1986 debut albums
Bob Geldof albums
Albums produced by Rupert Hine
Albums produced by Jimmy Iovine
Mercury Records albums